The 1985–86 UEFA Cup was the 15th season of the UEFA Cup, an annual club football tournament organised by UEFA. It was won by Real Madrid, who beat 1. FC Köln 5–3 on aggregate in the final. It was the first season in which English clubs were serving an indefinite ban from European football competitions, which meant two-time UEFA Cup winners Liverpool and Tottenham Hotspur, as well as Southampton and Norwich City were unable to compete.

Format
Following UEFA ranking changes and the English ban, Italy, Portugal, Soviet Union and Netherlands gained a third berth. Greece took a place from Denmark.

First round

|}

First leg

Second leg

Köln won 2–1 on aggregate.

Real Madrid won 5–1 on aggregate.

Milan won 4–3 on aggregate.

Lokomotiv Sofia won 6–4 on aggregate.

Athletic Bilbao won 5–1 on aggregate.

Club Brugge won 6–5 on aggregate.

Dundee United won 7–4 on aggregate.

Borussia Mönchengladbach won 3–1 on aggregate.

Lokomotive Leipzig won 6–1 on aggregate.

2–2 on aggregate; Vardar won on away goals.

PSV Eindhoven won 6–0 on aggregate.

4–4 on aggregate; Chornomorets Odesa won on away goals.

Dnipro won 5–2 on aggregate.

Spartak Moscow won 4–1 on aggregate.

Bohemians Praha won 5–4 on aggregate.

Hajduk Split won 7–3 on aggregate.

Internazionale won 5–1 on aggregate.

Waregem won 6–2 on aggregate.

Dinamo Tirana won 1–0 on aggregate.

LASK won 3–0 on aggregate.

Legia Warsaw won 4–1 on aggregate.

Neuchâtel Xamax won 7-4 on aggregate.

Hammarby won 7-1 on aggregate.

Partizan won 4-1 on aggregate.

RFC Liège won 4-1 on aggregate.

Osasuna won 2-1 on aggregate.

St Mirren won 3-1 on aggregate.

2–2 on aggregate; Sparta Rotterdam won on penalties.

Sporting CP won 4-3 on aggregate.

Torino won 3–2 on aggregate.

Nantes won 4–2 on aggregate.

3–3 on aggregate; Videoton won on away goals.

Second round

|}

First leg

Second leg

Köln won 8–2 on aggregate.

3–3 on aggregate; Milan won on away goals.

Dundee United won 3–1 on aggregate.

Spartak Moscow won 4–1 on aggregate.

Nantes won 5–1 on aggregate.

Hammarby won 5–4 on aggregate.

Waregem won 3–2 on aggregate.

Sporting CP won 1–0 on aggregate.

Internazionale won 4–1 on aggregate.

1–1 on aggregate; Neuchâtel Xamax won on away goals.

Dnipro won 3–2 on aggregate.

Athletic Bilbao won 4–1 on aggregate.

Real Madrid won 2–1 on aggregate.

Borussia Mönchengladbach won 6–2 on aggregate.

Hajduk Split won 4–2 on aggregate.

Legia Warsaw won 2–1 on aggregate.

Third round

|}

First leg

Second leg

Sporting CP won 4–2 on aggregate.

5–5 on aggregate; Real Madrid won on away goals.

Neuchâtel Xamax won 4–3 on aggregate.

Hajduk Split won 3–0 on aggregate.

Nantes won 2–1 on aggregate.

Köln won 4–3 on aggregate.

Internazionale won 1–0 on aggregate.

Following the referee's controversial decision to award Waregem a penalty in the 44th minute as the foul looked to be outside of the penalty area, Milan fans pelted the pitch with missiles some of which hit several Waregem players. Following the match, as a result of the incident, AC Milan received a two-match European competition stadium ban, enforced at the start of their 1987–88 UEFA Cup campaign.Waregem won 3–2 on aggregate.

Quarter-finals

|}

First leg

Second leg

Köln won 3–1 on aggregate.

1–1 on aggregate; Waregem won 5–4 on penalties.

Internazionale won 6–3 on aggregate.

Real Madrid won 3–2 on aggregate.

Semi-finals

|}

First leg

Second leg

Köln won 7–3 on aggregate.

Real Madrid won 6–4 on aggregate.

Final

First leg

Second leg

Real Madrid won 5–3 on aggregate.

Notes

External links
1985–86 All matches UEFA Cup – season at UEFA website
Official Site
Results at RSSSF.com
All scorers 1985–86 UEFA Cup according to protocols UEFA
1985/86 UEFA Cup - results and line-ups (archive)

UEFA Cup seasons
3